Lignincola is a genus of fungi in the family Halosphaeriaceae.
 The genus contains two species.

References

Sordariomycetes genera
Microascales